The Hon. Harriet Lepel Phipps, VA (22 January 1841– 7 March 1922) was an English courtier who served as a confidential attendant of Queen Victoria.

Harriet was the younger daughter of Sir Charles Beaumont Phipps, a courtier and confidant of the Queen, as Keeper of the Privy Purse. Harriet was appointed Maid of Honour in Ordinary to the Queen on 3 March 1862 (giving her the courtesy rank of a baron's daughter), and later served as a Woman of the Bedchamber from 1889 until Victoria's death. She was decorated with the Royal Order of Victoria and Albert, 4th class.

Phipps was used by the Queen to carry out confidential errands, and had access to many secrets, which she faithfully kept. Her papers were destroyed upon her death. Marie Mallet, a fellow lady of the bedchamber, found Phipps, as a messenger of instructions from Victoria, somewhat awe-inspiring, but "gay and excellent company and always warm-hearted".

Her 1889 portrait, by John Lavery, is now in the collection of the Glasgow Museums. 

Phipps was portrayed by Fenella Woolgar in the 2017 film Victoria & Abdul.

References

1841 births
1922 deaths
Ladies of the Royal Order of Victoria and Albert
British maids of honour
Harriet
19th-century English people
19th-century English women
20th-century English people
20th-century English women
Court of Queen Victoria